Solute carrier family 52 (riboflavin transporter), member 3, formerly known as chromosome 20 open reading frame 54 and riboflavin transporter 2, is a protein that in humans is encoded by the SLC52A3 gene.

Function 
This locus likely encodes a transmembrane protein that may function as a riboflavin transporter.

Clinical significance 
Mutations at this locus have been associated with Fazio–Londe disease and Brown-Vialetto-Van Laere syndrome.

Model organisms

Model organisms have been used in the study of C20orf54 function. The orthologous gene in mice is called 2310046K01Rik. A conditional knockout mouse line, called 2310046K01Riktm2a(KOMP)Wtsi was generated as part of the International Knockout Mouse Consortium program — a high-throughput mutagenesis project to generate and distribute animal models of disease to interested scientists.

Male and female animals underwent a standardized phenotypic screen to determine the effects of deletion. Twenty five tests were carried out on mutant mice and three significant abnormalities were observed.  No homozygous mutant embryos were identified during gestation, and therefore none survived until weaning. The remaining tests were carried out on heterozygous mutant adult mice and males had an increased mean corpuscular haemoglobin concentration.

References

Further reading

Genes mutated in mice